Soft and Beautiful is the fifteenth studio album by the American singer Aretha Franklin, released in the spring of 1969, by Columbia Records.

Background
The album was recorded when Franklin was 22 years old between July 9 and 16, 1964, It was her last album on Columbia before she moved to Atlantic Records and until 1969, unreleased, although an alternative version of "A Mother's Love" appeared on Franklin's 1966 Columbia LP Soul Sister. It reached Number 29 on Billboards R&B chart. Mark Bego, in Aretha Franklin: The Queen of Soul, called it "the most consistently paced album of her later Columbia years". Originally released by Columbia Records, the album was reissued on CD with her 1962 album The Tender, The Moving, The Swinging Aretha Franklin.

Track listingSide One"Only the Lonely" (Sammy Cahn, Jimmy Van Heusen)
"I Wish I Didn't Love You So" (Frank Loesser)
"(Ah, the Apple Trees) When the World Was Young" (Johnny Mercer, M. Philippe-Gérard)
"Shangri-La" (Carl Sigman, Robert Maxwell, Matty Malneck)
"A Mother's Love" (Cliff Owens)Side Two'''
"My Coloring Book" (John Kander, Fred Ebb)
"Jim" (Nelson Shawn, Caesar Petrillo, Edward Rose)
"Friendly Persuasion (Thee I Love)" (Paul Francis Webster, Dimitri Tiomkin)
"But Beautiful" (Johnny Burke, Jimmy Van Heusen)
"People" from Funny Girl'' (Jule Styne, Bob Merrill)

Personnel 
Aretha Franklin - vocals

References

Aretha Franklin albums
1969 albums
Columbia Records albums